Gjerstad is a village in Hadsel Municipality in Nordland county, Norway.  The village is located on the island of Langøya on the northern shore of the Hadselfjorden, just south of the border with Sortland Municipality. It is located approximately half-way between the towns of Stokmarknes and Sortland, and just north of the village of Grytting.

References

Hadsel
Villages in Nordland
Populated places of Arctic Norway